Fernando Espinoza may refer to:
Fernando Espinoza (Chilean footballer) (born 1991)
Fernando Espinosa (Mexican footballer) (born 1983)
 Fernando Espinoza (politician) (born 1968), Argentine politician